The 1970–71 Georgetown Hoyas men's basketball team represented Georgetown University during the 1970–71 NCAA University Division college basketball season. John Magee coached them in his fifth season as head coach. The team was an independent and played its home games at McDonough Gymnasium on the Georgetown campus in Washington, D.C. It finished the season with a record of 12-14 and had no post-season play.

Season recap

In recent seasons, Georgetown had established a pattern of strong starts followed by late-season collapses that sank hopes for a berth in a post-season tournament, losing seven of its final 10 games in the 1964-65 season, eight of its final 11 games in 1966-67, and seven of its last nine games in 1968-69. In 1969-70, however, it had played well enough for a bid in the 1970 National Invitation Tournament and had come close to defeating Pete Maravich and his Louisiana State teammates in the first round. With junior forward Art White – generally viewed at the time as the greatest player in Georgetown basketball history – as well as senior guard Don Weber and junior forward Mike Laughna returning, Magee had high hopes that a new era of success had dawned in Georgetown men's basketball.

Laughna had a strong season, shooting 48.2% from the field. Over the course of three consecutive games in February 1971 against American, Loyola, and New York University (NYU), he scored 76 points and pulled down 50 rebounds, and in the NYU game alone he grabbed 11 rebounds and scored 35 points, the only 30-plus-point scoring performance in a single game by a Georgetown player during the 1970s. During the season, he led the team in scoring in 14 games, including 10 of the last 11. White, meanwhile, scored in double figures in 21 of the seasons 26 games and averaged 14.2 points per game, and Weber closed out his collegiate career by scoring in double figures 13 times, shooting 44% from the field, and leading the team in assists for the second straight year with 100.

Magees hope that the 1970-71 team would build on the success of the  previous year went unfulfilled: The team played very poorly on defense and, after opening 3-5 and then winning six of its next eight to improve to 9-7, it returned to the pattern of the teams of the latter half of the 1960s, losing seven of its last 10 games. The season culminated in a meeting with longtime rival Fordham, ranked No. 13 in the Associated Press Poll, before a sellout crowd at McDonough Gymnasium on March 4, 1971. Rams guard/forward Charlie Yelverton scored 38 points to lead Fordham to an 81–68 victory that gave the Rams a 22–2 record, and the win clinched Fordham's first bid to the NCAA tournament since 1954.

Georgetown finished the season with a record of 12-14 and had no post-season play. Magees relationship with the team deteriorated as the season wore on. Praising only Laughna — when asked what lineup he would use for the team the following season, he said, "Laughna and four others" — Magee otherwise openly blamed the years results on the performance of his players, specifically calling White "a disappointment" in an interview with the campus newspaper The Hoya. White did not return to the team for the following season because of academic issues, presaging a dismal Hoya performance in 1971-72.

The 1970-71 team was not ranked in the Top 20 in the Associated Press Poll or Coaches' Poll at any time.

Roster
Source

1970–71 schedule and results

Sources

|-
!colspan=9 style="background:#002147; color:#8D817B;"| Regular Season

References

Georgetown Hoyas men's basketball seasons
Georgetown
Georgetown Hoyas men's basketball team
Georgetown Hoyas men's basketball team